Fiennes or Ffiennes may refer to:

Places
 Fiennes, a commune of the Pas-de-Calais département in northern France.

People
A toponymic surname pronounced  and borne by a prominent English family, descendant from Eustace I Fiennes, a nobleman in the 11th century from the region of Fiennes, then in County of Boulogne and part of Flanders. Better-known family members are:
James Fiennes, 1st Baron Saye and Sele (1395–1450)
Richard Fiennes, 7th Baron Dacre
Bessie Fiennes (1498–1540), née Bessie Blount, a mistress of Henry VIII
William Fiennes, 1st Viscount Saye and Sele (1582-1662)
Nathaniel Fiennes (1608–1669), politician
Celia Fiennes, (1662–1741), travel writer 
Geoffrey Twisleton-Wykeham-Fiennes, 18th Baron Saye and Sele (1858–1937)
Gerry Fiennes (1906–1985), British railway manager 
Sir Maurice Alberic Twisleton-Wykeham-Fiennes (1907–1974), businessman, father of Mark Fiennes, 
Nathaniel Fiennes, 21st Baron Saye and Sele (born 1920)
Mark Fiennes (1933–2004), photographer and illustrator. Father of:
Ralph Fiennes (born 1962), actor
Martha Fiennes (born 1964), film director and producer
Hero Fiennes Tiffin (born 1997), actor and model 
Magnus Fiennes (born 1965), composer and record producer
Sophie Fiennes (born 1967), film director and producer
Joseph Fiennes (born 1970), actor
Ranulph Fiennes (born 1944), adventurer
Susannah Fiennes (born 1961), artist
William Fiennes (author) (born 1970), writer
See :Category:Fiennes family for a larger list.
Henri Léopold de Fiennes (1898–1985), American film director known as Henry Hathaway

Given name
Fiennes Cornwallis (1831–1867), a British Army officer
Fiennes Cornwallis, 1st Baron Cornwallis (1864–1935), son of the above
Fiennes Cornwallis, 3rd Baron Cornwallis (1921–2010), grandson of the above
Fiennes Barrett-Lennard (1880–1963), British colonial judge and soldier

See also
Fynes
For members of the Fiennes family:
Baron Saye and Sele
Viscount Saye and Sele
Twisleton-Wykeham-Fiennes family
Lord Dacre

References